Outsiders Inn is an American half-hour reality television show which is a spin-off from Gone Country, but created through the process known as retroscripting. The series debuted on CMT August 15, 2008, where it ran for eight weeks. The series is executive produced by Jay Renfroe and David Garfinkle of Renegade 83 Productions and Sandy Chanley of Productions Partners Inc.

Details
Outsiders Inn follows Maureen McCormick's plans to open a Bed & Breakfast Inn in Newport, Tennessee. As she prepares to launch its opening, Maureen enlists her fellow contestants from Gone Country, Bobby Brown and Carnie Wilson, to help out, with Brown serving as entertainment director and Wilson as the head chef. Each episode chronicles the trio dealing with the rigors of running a bed and breakfast.

Production
The show was filmed at Christopher Place, An Intimate Resort in Newport, Tennessee, where taping began on June 9, 2008 and ended on June 29, 2008.

Episode Two, titled "Pigeon Idol," was shot at Fiddler's Roost in Parrottsville, Tennessee on June 15, 2008, where the celebs judged a talent contest hosted by Ross Mathews from The Tonight Show.

Episodes

References

External links
Official website
Official news release from CMT
Christopher Place, An Intimate Resort

Television shows set in Tennessee
2008 American television series debuts
CMT (American TV channel) original programming
American television spin-offs
2000s American reality television series
2008 American television series endings